RV Western Flyer is a twin hulled SWATH research vessel operated by the Monterey Bay Aquarium Research Institute (MBARI). Its relatively stable SWATH design permits expanded operational capability in rough sea states. It is the platform of operations for the ROV Doc Ricketts (named after Ed Ricketts). The vessel carries 10 crew, 5 ROV pilots, and 11 scientists, for a total complement of 26. Cruises generally center around the central California coast and Monterey Bay, although excursions further afield to Hawaii, the Pacific Northwest, and the Gulf of California have taken place in recent years.

Vessel description/ design characteristics

General arrangement
Accommodations are provided for a combination of 26 crew members and scientists in 14 staterooms located on the upper deck. The crew complement is ten for all voyages and the combination of ROV staff and scientists (16) brings the total vessel complement to 26.

Equipment and control/monitoring systems
The main machinery plant is diesel electric with a common power bus connecting five generators. Any combination of generator operation will provide power for both propulsion and other vessel operations. This design arrangement provides a high level of machinery plant redundancy and operational flexibility. Propulsion power is transmitted through two duplicate drive trains, each consisting of a DC electric motor and fixed pitch propeller. Silicon controlled rectifiers (SCR's) are used to convert generated AC power to DC propulsive power. Two electric motor-driven bow thrusters are installed to enhance maneuvering and station-keeping.

Primary equipment and control/monitoring systems
Four SCR drives: GE, Model DC2000
Fuel centrifuge: Alfa Laval, Model MAB 103
Marine sanitation device:  Orca, Model 11A-36
Air compressor: Quincy, Model QR 25
One water-maker:  Sea Recovery model SCR5M3-SW-H
Cathodic protection/monitor: Swath Ocean Systems, Inc.
Uninterruptible power supply: Exide Pwr Wave +18, J1842AU131EE00A
Monitoring system: Exide Pwr Wave +18, J1842AU131EE00A
Generator control: Point 8
Propulsion control:  Nautronix/GE/Omnithruster
Bow thruster control: Omnithruster B2000
Ballast system control: Swath Ocean Systems, Inc.

Primary navigation and communication equipment
GPS: Leica MX420, Furuno SC120
Radar: Furuno, Models FR2110 & FR1941
Gyro compass: Sperry FOG Furuno SC120
Dynamic positioning: Nautronix, Model ASK 4001
Autopilot:    Maritime Dynamics Inc, Nautronix ASK 4001.
Motion Control: Maritime Dynamics Inc.
Steering system: Swath Ocean Systems, Inc. / Maritime Dynamics
GMDSS station: Furuno model RC5000 3T, areas A1-A3
Depth sounder: Knudsen 3208/R (good to 5000m)
PBX system: Knudsen 3208/R (good to 5000m)
Weather station: Barometer, wind indicator, Furuno FW-200
Computing station:  Chart and Navigation
Dopler: Furuno CI-80 current indicator

Primary fire fighting and safety equipment
Fire detection and alarm system: Cerebus Pyrotronics MXL
SOLAS Rescue Boat: Ribcraft 5.85m with 75 Honda outboard motor
Life rafts: Two 25-Man Viking
Extinguishing systems:  Portable & fixed - (7) Fire Hose Stations
EPIRB:
 Two 9Ghz SARTs
 One 406Mhz w/121.5 MHz beacon

Primary deck machinery
Cranes:
 One - Model HIAB 290
 One - Modified Allied
CTD winch system: Dynacon 12030
Capacity: 6500 m of .322 in. cable
Max. continuous line pull:
Bare drum - 7000 lbs.@100 fpm
Full drum - 4300 lbs.@140 fpm
Max. continuous line speed:
Bare drum - 240 fpm @ 2500 lbs.
Full drum - 415 fpm @ 1450 lbs.
Anchor windlass: Kolstrand Akphaw 223324
Mooring winches: Four - Marco WG023
ROV umbilical handling system: Dynacon TV3615K/SW3616K
Stern "A-Frame": 13,000 lbs. SWL;
14 ft wide, 13 ft clearance through entire range of motion

References

External links
 MBARI Marine Operations

Research vessels of the United States
Monterey Bay Aquarium
1996 ships